The 2001 NCAA Division I-AA football rankings are from the Sports Network poll of Division I-AA head coaches, athletic directors, sports information directors and media members.  This is for the 2001 season. Due to the events of September 11, 2001, all college football games were suspended during the following weekend. As a result, the poll released on September 18 was a repeat of the one released a week earlier.

Legend

The Sports Network poll

References

Rankings
NCAA Division I FCS football rankings